John R. Callahan (1853 – February 12, 1918) was a pioneer in the field of dentistry and particularly dental research in the late 19th and early 20th centuries.

Born in Hillsboro, Ohio in 1853, Callahan received his dental degree from the Philadelphia Dental College in 1877. He practiced dentistry in San Francisco for two years before returning to Hillsboro where he practiced until 1890. He then moved to Cincinnati, Ohio joining the practice of Dr. C. R. Taft.

In 1884 he was selected Secretary of the Ohio State Dental Society and served until 1890. In 1892 he was elected President of the Society and was a member of the Board of Directors from 1894-1918. He served as President of the Cincinnati Dental Society 1906-1907.

His major research was in diseases of the dental pulp. He also contributed papers on materials and methods for filling root canals; notably, chloro-percha. His original contribution of the use of sulfuric acid for opening root canals was significant at the time as were his investigations on dental materials and patient management problems.

Callahan was a member of the Institute on Dental Research of the National Dental Association. The Jarvie Fellowship Medal was awarded to him in 1917. He died on February 12, 1918.

The Callahan Memorial Award Commission
To perpetuate Callahan's memory, the Ohio State Dental Society in 1920 established the Callahan Memorial Award Commission which was given two charges. First, a bronze bust of Callahan sculpted by Frederick C. Hibbard of Chicago was placed on the grounds of the Cincinnati General Hospital – in 1937 it was moved to the College of Dentistry of the Ohio State University. Second, the awarding of an Annual Callahan Memorial Award Medallion, recognizing excellence in the profession. The names of the recipients are inscribed on a bronze plaque displayed in the Ohio Dental Association headquarters.

Since 1941, the Callahan Memorial Commission has also given a scholarship prize to the highest ranking dental graduate from both Case Western Reserve University and The Ohio State University. The names of the recipients are inscribed on bronze plaques displayed in these institutions.

Callahan Memorial Awardees
1922 - James Leon Williams
1923 - Frederick B. Noyes
1924 -	Clarence J. Grives
1925 -	Edward C. Rosenow
1926 -	Percy R. Howe
1927 -	Howard R. Raper
1928 -	William J.Gies
1929 -	Russel W. Bunting
1930 -	Rodrigues Ottolengui
1931 -	Weston A. Price
1932 -	Herman Prinz
1933 -	Homer C. Brown
1934 -	U. Garfield Rickert
1935 -	E.V. McCollum
1936 -	C.N. Johnson
1937 -	Harvey J. Burkhart
1938 -	Joseph L.T. Appleton
1939 -	Clarence O. Simpson
1940 -	Arthur H. Merritt
1941 -	Edward H. Hatton
1942 -	Marcus L. Ward
1943 -	Arno B. Luckhardt
1944 -	J. Ben Robinson
1946 -	James Roy Blayney
1947 -	Edgar D. Coolidge
1948 -	Herman Becks
1949 -	Frederick S. McKay
1950 -	Thomas J. Hill
1951 -	Kurt H. Thoma
1952 -	Holly Broadbent
1953 -	Paul C. Kitchin
1954 -	Charles F. Bodecker
1955 -	Joseph L. Bernier
1956 -	Edward C. Stafne
1957 -	Allan G. Brodie
1958 -	George C. Paffenbarger
1959 -	Henry Trendley Dean
1960 -	Paul H. Jeserich
1961 -	Paul O. Pedersen
1962 -	Clyde H. Schuyler
1963 -	Francis A. Arnold
1964 -	Hamilton Robinson
1965 -	Herbert Cooper
1966 -	Paul E. Boyle
1966 -	Wendell D. Postle
1967 -	Wilton M. Krogman
1968 -	Ralph W. Phillips
1969 -	Harold Hillenbrand
1970 -	Carl O. Boucher
1971 -	Donald Kerr
1972 -	Hans H. Friehofer
1972 -	Robert B.Shira
1973 -	Philip E. Blackerby
1974 -	Maynard K. Hine
1975 -	Seymour J. Kreshover
1976 -	Rafael L. Bowen
1977 -	Lindsey D. Pankey
1978 -	Robert J. Nelsen
1979 -	Joseph F. Volker
1980 -	Rex Ingraham
1981 -	Wallace D. Armstrong
1982 -	Louis J. Baume
1982 -	Judson C.Hickey
1983 -	William G. Shafer
1984 -	Nelson W. Rupp
1985 - David B.Scott
1986 -	Morgan L. Allison
1987 -	Harry Lyons
1988 -	Gardner Foley
1989 -	Wilmer B. Eames
1990 -	Charles McCullum
1991 -	Alvin L. Morris
1992 -	Julian B. Woelfel
1993 -	D. Walter Cohen
1994 -	Paul M. Flory
1995 -	Harald Lõe
1996 -	William R. Proffit
1997 -	Irwin D. Mandel
1998 -	Gordon J. Christensen
1998 -	Samuel D. Harris
1999 -	Arthur S. Dugoni
2000 -	Burton C. Borgelt
2001 -	Harold C. Slavkin
2002 -	Lawrence H. Meskin
2003 -	Clifton O. Dummett
2004 -	Linda C. Niessen
2004 -	P.I. Brañemark
2005 -	Robert J. Genco
2006 -	Jeanne Sinkford
2007 -	Bernard Machen
2008 -	Roy Page
2009 - Lysle Johnston
2010 - Jack Gottschalk
2011 - Dushanka Kleinman
2012 - Dominick P. DePaola
2013 - Sol Siverman
2014 - Marcia Boyd

References

 Dental Summary, A Journal of Practical Dentistry, v. 38 (public domain, 1918), L.P. Bethel, MD, DDS, editor.  Ransom & Randolph, publisher

American dentists
1853 births
1918 deaths
People from Hillsboro, Ohio
19th-century dentists